The Hewlett Packard Enterprise Company (HPE) is an American multinational information technology company based in Spring, Texas, United States.

HPE was founded on November 1, 2015, in Palo Alto, California, as part of the splitting of the Hewlett-Packard company. It is a business-focused organization which works in servers, storage, networking, containerization software and consulting and support.

The split was structured so that the former Hewlett-Packard Company would change its name to HP Inc. and spin off Hewlett Packard Enterprise as a newly created company. HP Inc. retained the old HP's personal computer and printing business, as well as its stock-price history and original NYSE ticker symbol for Hewlett-Packard; Enterprise trades under its own ticker symbol: HPE. At the time of the spin-off, HPE's revenue was slightly less than that of HP Inc.

In 2017, HPE spun off its Enterprise Services business and merged it with Computer Sciences Corporation to become DXC Technology. Also in 2017, it spun off its software business segment and merged it with Micro Focus.

HPE was ranked No. 107 in the 2018 Fortune 500 list of the largest United States corporations by total revenue.

Naming

The full name for the company is "Hewlett Packard Enterprise Company", which drops the hyphen that previously existed between the "Hewlett" and "Packard" of the former Hewlett-Packard Company. The company is commonly referred to as "Hewlett Packard Enterprise" or by its initials "HPE".

The company has also been referred to as "HP Enterprise" by some media outlets and has even been incorrectly referred to as "HP Enterprises".

History

The merger of HPE Enterprise Services with CSC, to form a new company DXC Technology, was completed on March 10, 2017. Approximately 100,000 current HPE employees were affected. More than 30,000 services employees from other areas of the HPE business remained at HPE including technology services support and consulting as well as software professional services.

In August 2016, the company announced plans to acquire Silicon Graphics International (SGI), known for their capabilities in high performance computing.

On September 7, 2016, HPE announced a "spin-merge" with Micro Focus, who would acquire HPE's "non-core" software (which included the HP Autonomy unit), and HPE shareholders would own 50.1 percent of the merged company, which would retain its current name. The merger concluded on September 1, 2017.

In November 2016, PC World wrote that "HPE, and before it, Hewlett-Packard, failed to develop middleware tools to really make a dent in the software market, where other companies like IBM, SAP, and Oracle are excelling," and that "without major software product lines, HPE's integrated offerings won't be as strong as competitors like Dell, which have the software and hardware assets", adding that "If all HPE is doing at this point is focusing largely on hardware, you have to ask what the end game here is."

In September 2016, Hewlett Packard Enterprise transferred two patents to Texas-based wholly owned shell company Plectrum LLC. These two patents were originated at the 3Com Corporation, which was bought by HP in 2010, along with about 1,400 patents.

On April 11, 2017, it was reported that Synack had raised  in a round of funding that included Hewlett Packard Enterprise.

In January 2017, the company acquired data management platform SimpliVity, the developer of the OmniCube hyper-converged infrastructure appliance, for US$650M.

In October, Reuters reported that the company had allowed a Russian defense agency to examine a cyber-defense system used by The Pentagon. The report noted: "Six former U.S. intelligence officials, as well as former ArcSight [Hewlett Packard Enterprise] employees and independent security experts, said the source code review could help Moscow discover weaknesses in the software, potentially helping attackers to blind the U.S. military to a cyber attack."

In November 2017, Meg Whitman announced that she would be stepping down as CEO, after six years at the helm of HP and HPE, stating that, on February 1, 2018, Antonio Neri would officially become HPE's president and chief executive officer. The announcement created controversy leading to a 6% drop in stock price, which quickly recovered during the next few days.

In June 2018, Hewlett Packard Enterprise launched a hybrid cloud service called GreenLake Hybrid Cloud, built on top of HPE's OneSphere cloud management SaaS console, offered under its brand HPE GreenLake. GreenLake is designed to provide cloud management, cost control, and compliance control capabilities, and will run on AWS and Microsoft Azure. GreenLake includes cloud data services for containers, machine learning, storage, compute, data protection and networking through a management portal called GreenLake Central.

In February 2019, Meg Whitman announced she would not be seeking re-election to the board of directors, ending her professional involvement in HPE.

The announcement came soon after Cray had landed a  US Department of Energy contract to supply the Frontier supercomputer to Oak Ridge National Laboratory in 2021.

In December 2020, Hewlett Packard Enterprise disclosed it is relocating its corporate headquarters from San Jose, California to Spring, Texas, a northern suburb of Houston. As of December 2021, HPE headquarters remain at the former HP property and headquarters campus of Compaq in northwest Harris County near SH 249 and Louetta. Construction of the new Springwoods Village campus in Spring is expected to complete sometime in early 2022. Concerns about major flooding at the Compaq complex were a contributing factor for HPE CEO Antonio Neri to have the new campus built. The old campus had previously been flooded by Hurricane Harvey in 2017.

Corporate affairs
The headquarters is in Houston, in a limited purpose annexation area.

Operating segments
 Intelligent Edge (10% of FY20 revenue) – offers platforms designed for network security, including Aruba Networks and Silver Peak Systems
 HPC & MCS (11% of FY20 revenue) – High Performance Compute and Mission Critical Systems. Also includes Hewlett Packard Labs
 Compute (44% of FY20 revenue) – the core server business
 Storage (17% of FY20 revenue) – the core storage business, including recent acquisition Zerto
 HPE Financial Services (12% of FY20 revenue) – provides financing services for HPE customers and partners
 A&PS (4% of FY20 revenue) – Advisory and Professional Services through 'HPE Pointnext'.
 Corporate Investments (2% of FY20 revenue) – includes 'HPE Pathfinder' (HPE's venture capital arm) and the Communications Technology Group

CEO Antonio Neri announced in 2019 that he expects all products to be sold 'as a service' by 2022  via HPE Greenlake.

Products
 Intelligent Edge: Aruba Networks, Silver Peak Systems, FlexFabric
 HPC & MCS: Apollo (High-Performance Computing), Cray
 Compute: HP XP, HPE GreenLake Hybrid Cloud, Edgeline, Cloudline, Synergy, OneView, OneSphere, ProLiant, Synergy, Cloudline, Edgeline, HPE Integrity Servers, NonStop, HPE Superdome, Apollo (High-Performance Computing), Simplivity (HyperConvergence)
 Storage: HPE 3PAR, StoreOnce, StoreEver, Nimble Storage, HP XP, HPE GreenLake Hybrid Cloud, HPE Alletra, HPE Primera, MSA, Nimble & Alletra dHCI
 Communications Technology Group: OpenCall and Service Activator

Acquisitions

Note: Aruba Networks was acquired by the Hewlett-Packard Company before demerger and was inducted into Hewlett Packard Enterprise while demerging.

Carbon footprint
HPE reported Total CO2e emissions (Direct + Indirect) for the twelve months ending 30 September 2020 at 343 Kt (-48 /-12.4% y-o-y). The company commits to reduce emissions by 55% by 2025 from 2016 base year, and this science-based target is aligned with the Paris Agreement to limit global warming to 1.5 °C above pre-industrial levels.

See also
 List of networking hardware vendors
 HP Inc. – the demerged sibling company that offers printers and personal computers.
 HP Release Control
 Hewlett Packard Labs – the research & development arm of Hewlett Packard Enterprise.

References

External links
 

2015 establishments in California
American companies established in 2015
Companies listed on the New York Stock Exchange
Computer companies of the United States
Computer storage companies
Cloud computing providers
Information technology companies of the United States
Multinational companies headquartered in the United States
Software companies of the United States
Software companies based in Texas
Computer companies established in 2015
Software companies established in 2015
Corporate spin-offs
Companies based in Houston